Flying Regiment 5 ( or LeR 5) was a mixed fighter and bomber aircraft regiment of the Finnish Air Force during World War II. The regiment took part in the Continuation War and the Lapland War. The regiment was formed around the No. 6 Sqn, which previously had been subordinated the Finnish Navy HQ, and tasked with anti-submarine and maritime patrols. The No. 30 Sqn was a fighter squadron.

The regiment was responsible for the air defence of Southern Finland and of the western Gulf of Finland.

Organization

Continuation War
No. 6 Squadron: bomber squadron
No. 30 Squadron: fighter squadron

After World War II, the regiment and its squadrons were re-organized and the new squadrons were renamed No. 31, and No. 33 Squadrons.

Aircraft
Tupolev SB
Dornier Do 22
Blackburn Ripon IIF
Polikarpov I-16
Polikarpov I-153
Fokker D.XXI
Hawker Hurricane Mk.I

Sources
Keskinen, Kalevi & Stenman, Kari: Finnish Air Force 1939-1945, Squadron/Signal publications, Carrollton, Texas, 1998, 

Regiments of the Finnish Air Force
Continuation War